Menu pricing may refer to:
 the pricing of menus
 product versioning, a form of price differentiation